William Richards (6 October 1874 – 12 February 1926) was an English footballer who played as a centre forward.

He played in the Football League for West Bromwich Albion and Newton Heath.

Biography 
Richards was born in West Bromwich and turned professional with West Bromwich Albion in July 1894. He scored on his debut to help Albion beat Wolves 5–1 in September 1894. Richards picked up a runners-up medal in the 1895 FA Cup Final and was the club's top scorer in the 1895–96 and 1898–99 seasons. He was transferred to Newton Heath in April 1901 for a £40 fee and the following year moved to Stourbridge on a free transfer. In September 1904 he joined Halesowen Town, where he ended his playing career, retiring in April 1907. He died in West Bromwich in 1926.

References 
General
 
Specific

1874 births
1926 deaths
Sportspeople from West Bromwich
English footballers
Association football forwards
Coventry City F.C. players
West Bromwich Albion F.C. players
Manchester United F.C. players
Stourbridge F.C. players
Halesowen Town F.C. players
English Football League players
FA Cup Final players